Jordan Nicolas Vestering  is a Singaporean-Dutch footballer currently playing as a left-back or left-midfielder for Singapore Premier League Club Hougang United and the Singapore National Team.

Early life
He was born to a Dutch father and a Malay mother.  His brother, Joaquin Vestering, plays his football with the Singapore Sports School.

Early career
He played at National Football Academy level from 13 to 17. He signed with Hougang's Under-19 team at the start of the 2018 season.

Club career

Hougang United
Vestering made his first league appearance against Albirex Niigata FC (S) on 6 May.  He scored his first goal for the club in 2019, against Geylang International through a cross by Zulfahmi Arifin. The defender was named one of Singapore's 10 biggest talents by Goal in 2020, making the online publication's NxGn SG list. He left Hougang in July 2020 to serve in the Singapore Armed Forces and complete his mandatory NS.

International career

Youth
Vestering made his debut for the under-22 on against Fiji on 6 September 2019. He provided an assist for Daniel Goh who scored his first goal.

Senior
Vestering was invited for the national team training on 3 and 10 March 2020. This marks his first involvement with the senior side.

Career statistics 
As of 14 July 2020

International statistics

U22 International caps

U22 International goals
Scores and results list Singapore's goal tally first.

U19 International caps

U16 International caps

U16 International goals
Scores and results list Singapore's goal tally first.

References

2000 births
Living people
Singaporean footballers
Singaporean people of Dutch descent
Association football midfielders
Singapore Premier League players
Competitors at the 2019 Southeast Asian Games
Southeast Asian Games competitors for Singapore